Columbia is a town in Tolland County, Connecticut, United States. The population was 5,272 at the 2020 census. Originally a part of Lebanon, known as the North Society or Lebanon's Crank, Columbia was incorporated in May 1804. The town was named for patriotic reasons after the national symbol "Columbia". Columbia offers pre-kindergarten through 8th grade education in town at Horace W. Porter School, while high school students have a choice of attending four nearby high schools;  E.O Smith High School, Bolton High School (Connecticut), Coventry High School, and Windham Technical High School, part of the Connecticut Technical High School System).

Geography

Demographics

As of the census of 2000, there were 4,971 people, 1,864 households, and 1,463 families living in the town. The racial makeup of the town was 97.43% White, 0.38% African American, 0.08% Native American, 0.70% Asian, 0.06% Pacific Islander, 0.56% from other races, and 0.78% from two or more races. Hispanic or Latino of any race were 1.69% of the population.

There were 1,864 households, out of which 36.2% had children under the age of 18 living with them, 68.1% were married couples living together, 7.4% had a female householder with no husband present, and 21.5% were non-families. Of all households 17.3% were made up of individuals, and 6.8% had someone living alone who was 65 years of age or older.  The average household size was 2.65 and the average family size was 3.01.

In the town, the population was spread out, with 26.2% under the age of 18, 4.6% from 18 to 24, 30.3% from 25 to 44, 28.1% from 45 to 64, and 10.9% who were 65 years of age or older.  The median age was 40 years. For every 100 females, there were 95.8 males.  For every 100 females age 18 and over, there were 94.7 males.

The median income for a household in the town was $70,208, and the median income for a family was $77,665. Males had a median income of $51,250 versus $37,685 for females. The per capita income for the town was $29,446.  About 1.8% of families and 4.2% of the population were below the poverty line, including 6.0% of those under age 18 and 5.3% of those age 65 or over.

On the National Register of Historic Places
Columbia Green Historic District

Notable people

 Anthony Gregorc, psychologist. Currently resides in Columbia
 Dwight Loomis (1821–1903), US Congressman and Connecticut Supreme Court judge
 Alfred Wright (1788–1853), physician, Presbyterian missionary to Choctaw Nation, translator, educator and founder of Wheelock Seminary was born in Columbia

See also

References

External links
 Town Web site

 
Greater Hartford
Towns in Connecticut
Towns in Tolland County, Connecticut